The MCW Southern Light Heavyweight Championship was the title for lighter wrestlers in the Memphis Championship Wrestling professional wrestling promotion. It was rather short-lived, lasting from 2000 to 2001.

Title history

|-
!1
|The Fabulous Rocker
|
|
|Memphis, Tennessee
|1
|
|
|
|-
!2
|Al Keeholic
|
|
|Memphis, Tennessee
|1
|
|
|
|-
!3
|American Dragon
|
|
|Jackson, Mississippi
|1
|
|
|
|-
!4
|Spanky
|
|
|Vicksburg, Mississippi
|1
|
|
|
|-
!5
|style="background: #dddddd;" colspan=5|Title held up after a match against Derrick King on 2000-12-30 in Memphis, Tennessee.
|-
!6
|Spanky
|
|
|Bogota, Tennessee
|2
|
|
|
|-
!7
|Tyler Gates
|
|
|
|1
|
|
|
|-
!8
|Spanky
|
|
|Coldwater, Mississippi
|3
|
|
|
|-
|style="background: #dddddd;" colspan=5|Title stripped on 2001-06-01 in Marmaduke, Arkansas, and abandoned.
|-
|}

Combined reigns

See also
Memphis Championship Wrestling

References

Light heavyweight wrestling championships
Regional professional wrestling championships
Memphis Championship Wrestling championships